Santa Claus Is Comin' to Town is a 1970 stop motion Christmas television special produced by Rankin/Bass Productions in New York, New York. The film is narrated by Fred Astaire and stars the voices of Mickey Rooney, Keenan Wynn, Robie Lester, Joan Gardner, and Paul Frees, as well as an assistant song performance by the Westminster Children's Choir. The film tells the story of how Santa Claus and several Claus-related Christmas traditions came to be. It is based on the hit Christmas song "Santa Claus Is Comin' to Town", which was written by J. Fred Coots and Haven Gillespie for Leo Feist, Inc. and introduced on radio by Eddie Cantor in 1934, and the story of Saint Nicholas.

The special was created using Japanese stop motion animation called "Animagic", in which all the characters are made out of wood and plastic and animated via stop-motion photography. The special was originally telecast on December 13, 1970 by ABC, which continues to air the special every year along with its sister network Freeform as of 2020 (commemorating the special's 50th anniversary), though both channels have at times edited the special to make room for commercials.

Plot
After a newsreel prologue stating that children around the world are preparing for the arrival of Santa Claus, a postman named Special Delivery "S.D." Kluger is introduced. When his mail truck breaks down, he tells the story of Santa in response to several letters sent from children.

The story begins in the gloomy city of Sombertown, ruled by the ill-tempered Burgermeister Meisterburger. A baby arrives on his doorstep with a nametag reading "Claus" and a note requesting that the Burgermeister raise the child, but he instead orders his henchman and lawkeeper Grimsley to take the baby to an orphanage. On the way there, a gust of wind blows both sled and baby to the Mountain of the Whispering Winds, where the animals hide him from the Winter Warlock and take him to the Kringle elf family. Led by their matron, Tanta Kringle, they adopt the baby and name him “Kris”. A few years later, Kris hopes to restore the Kringles' title as the "first toymakers to the king.”

When Kris is old enough, he volunteers to deliver the toys to Sombertown. Meanwhile, the Burgermeister, after tripping on a toy wooden duck, causing him to fall down a flight of stairs and suffering a leg injury, bans all toys in the town, declaring that anyone found possessing a toy will be arrested and thrown into the dungeon. On his way to Sombertown, Kris meets a lost penguin whom he names Topper. In the town, he offers toys to two children washing their stockings by a water fountain. As the children are about to play with the toys, Kris is stopped by Miss Jessica, their lovely schoolteacher, but she softens toward Kris when he offers her a china doll as a "peace offering". As Kris gives out more toys, the Burgermeister arrives and orders the children arrested. Kris stops him and gives him a yo-yo, which the Burgermeister enjoys until Grimsley informs him that he is breaking his own law. Kris and Topper manage to evade capture and run into the woods. 

As Kris and Topper start their journey back to the Kringles, the Winter Warlock captures them with his tree monsters, but when Kris gives him a toy train as a present, the Warlock's evil exterior melts away and he befriends Kris. To repay him, Winter reunites Kris with Jessica, who informs him that the Burgermeister destroyed all the toys and the children now want new ones. To protect the town from further toy deliveries, the Burgermeister orders all doors and windows to be locked, but Kris enters by the chimneys and places toys in the children's stockings.

The Burgermeister then sets a trap for Kris and Topper as he makes another delivery while his soldiers capture the Kringles and Winter. Jessica pleads with the Burgermeister to release her friends, but he refuses. Jessica determines that she belongs with Kris and goes to the prison, to rescue everyone. Jessica asks Winter to break everyone out but he sadly refuses, having very little magic left, save for some magic feed corn which enables reindeer to fly. With the reindeer's help, the entire group escapes. After months as an outlaw and discovery that their home was destroyed by the Burgermeister's guards, Kris grows a beard as a disguise. After Tanta suggests he return to his original name "Claus" for safety, Kris marries Jessica. After the wedding ceremony, the group travels to the North Pole to build a castle and toy workshop.

As the years pass and Kris and Jessica grow older, Kris continues to travel only at night, as he's still considered an outlaw. Eventually, the Meisterburgers died off and lost power over Sombertown and most of the laws were deemed ridiculous and revoked as Kris's legend goes worldwide, and he's deemed a saintly figure, becoming Santa Claus. As the years pass, Santa becomes unable to fulfill all the toy requests throughout the year and resolves to limit his trips to one night a year: Christmas Eve. As Santa prepares to head out on that night, Winter tells him that he has regained his magic and can guarantee a white Christmas.

After the story, S.D. Kluger suddenly realizes that it's getting late and remembers that he still has to deliver the letters to Santa and leaves for the North Pole with Topper, Winter, the Kringles, and a parade of children, singing "Santa Claus Is Coming to Town" during the credits while Santa and his wife are seen silhouetted in an upstairs window as Jessica helps puts on his hat and Santa steps out of his castle, smiling and waving goodbye to the viewers.

Voice cast
 Fred Astaire as Special Delivery "S.D." Kluger
 Mickey Rooney as Kris Kringle/Santa Claus
 Keenan Wynn as Winter Warlock
 Robie Lester as Miss Jessica/Mrs. Claus
 Paul Frees as Burgermeister Meisterburger, Grimsley, Topper, animals, guards, doctor, Newsreel Announcer, Kringle Brothers, male townspeople, businessman, Scrooge-related man, and more 
 Joan Gardner as Tanta Kringle, stores lady, female townspeople, and more 
 Dina Lynn, Greg Thomas, Gary White, and Andrea Sacino as the children (Greg Thomas also as Young Kris Kringle)

Songs

 "The First Toymakers to the King" sung by Tanta and the Kringles featuring the Mike Sammes Singers
 "No More Toymakers to the King" sung by Burgermeister Meisterburger and Grimsley
 "Be Prepared to Pay" a.k.a. "If You Sit On My Lap Today" sung by Kris and the Westminster Children's Choir
 "Put One Foot in Front of the Other" sung by Kris and Winter featuring The Mike Sammes Singers
 "My World Is Beginning Today" sung by Jessica
 "Wedding Song" a.k.a. "What Better Way to Tell You" sung by S. D. Kluger and The Mike Sammes Singers
 "Santa Claus Is Comin' to Town" sung by S. D. Kluger and the Westminster Children's Choir

Released by Rhino on October 1, 2002, the soundtrack for Santa Claus Is Comin' to Town is available along with that of Frosty the Snowman, the Rankin-Bass special produced the previous year in 1969. This edition contains the full dialogue and all songs for both specials.

Editing by ABC, Viacom and Freeform
The special has been edited for content and length by ABC, Viacom, and Freeform since its original airing. As early as 1986, ABC cut two songs from the special ("My World Is Beginning Today" and "What Better Way to Tell You"), as well as two other songs in half.

When Viacom syndicated the special to local television stations in the 1980s and 1990s, only the songs (with the exception of "Put One Foot In Front Of The Other") were shortened for time while "What Better Way To Tell You" was removed entirely.

Freeform has cut several scenes they believe may be traumatizing to younger viewers, such as Kris climbing and leaping to escape (which was cut to prevent children from trying to imitate the same stunt), Winter Warlock knowing Kris will return and telling him he will never escape, and the scene where the Burgermeister torches the seized toys in front of the children of Sombertown.

In 2019, Freeform's print of the special included the 2012 Universal Pictures logo preceding the film, due to their 2016 purchase of DreamWorks Animation (the current owner of the pre-1974 Rankin/Bass library), and the scenes that were originally cut were added as well.

Home media
Beginning in 1989, the special has been released numerous times on VHS and DVD. The 2005 DVD release included a CD single of Mariah Carey performing the title song. The special is also available as part of a DVD box set with other Rankin/Bass Christmas titles including Rudolph the Red-Nosed Reindeer and Frosty the Snowman, and Bill Melendez's Frosty Returns. In 2010, the special was released in the same box set on Blu-ray Disc. In 2015, both the special and Frosty the Snowman were released on Blu-ray Disc/DVD combo packs in the 45th Anniversary Collector's Edition. In 2022, the special was released on 4K Ultra HD.

Reception

The film has an aggregated review score of 93% based on 14 reviews on Rotten Tomatoes with a critic consensus stating: "Arriving with light-hearted cheeriness and the best musical numbers, Santa Claus Is Comin To Town is a magical story told by charming wood-figure animation."

Novelization
A novelization of the film was published by Running Press in 2008 in an oversized children's hardback edition. The script was adapted by Sierra Harimann with watercolor illustrations based on the original show by Michael Koelsch. There are some additional details in the book, although it is unknown if they are from the imagination of the author or were based on the original script. The Dismal Forest is at the foot of the Mountain of the Whispering Winds. The little girl and boy Kris meets when he arrives are named Annette and Andy. The Sombertown Dungeon was built like a fort with a courtyard in the center, and it is there that the reindeer land to rescue everyone.

Video game

A video game based on the film was released on November 8, 2011 for the Nintendo DS and Wii.

See also
The Easter Bunny Is Comin' to Town
List of Rankin/Bass Productions films
 List of Christmas films
 Santa Claus in film

References

External links

1970 animated films
1970 films
1970 in American television
1970 television specials
1970s American animated films
1970s American television specials
American Broadcasting Company television specials
American children's animated fantasy films
American children's films
Animated Christmas television specials
1970s animated television specials
Christmas television specials
Films about elves
Films based on songs
Films scored by Maury Laws
Television shows directed by Jules Bass
Television shows directed by Arthur Rankin Jr.
Films set in the Arctic
Santa Claus in film
Santa Claus in television
Stop-motion animated short films
Rankin/Bass Productions television specials
Stop-motion animated television shows
Television shows written by Romeo Muller
American Christmas television specials
1970s children's animated films